Stefan Kisieliński (13 December 1901 – 9 March 1951) was a Polish footballer. He played in six matches for the Poland national football team from 1926 to 1928.

References

External links
 

1901 births
1951 deaths
Polish footballers
Poland international footballers
Place of birth missing
Association footballers not categorized by position